Thomas James Howard Jr. (September 11, 1894 – 8 October 1961) was an American photographer who worked at the Washington bureau of P. & A. Photographs during the 1920s. His photograph of the execution of Ruth Snyder in the electric chair at Sing Sing Prison, on January 12, 1928, has been called "the most famous tabloid photo of the decade".

The execution photo
Photographers are not permitted into executions in the United States, so the New York Daily News, determined to secure a photograph, resorted to subterfuge. They brought in Howard, who was not known to the prison warders or journalists in the New York area. He arrived early and, passing himself in by posing as a writer, he took up a vantage position so as to be able to take pictures with the help of a miniature camera that he had strapped to his right ankle. The camera had a single photographic plate that was linked by cable to the shutter release concealed within his jacket. When Snyder's body shook from the jolt, Howard pressed the shutter release, exposing the plate. The image appeared to have caught the subject in motion from the execution, which added to the already dramatic scene.

The photograph was published the next day on the front page of the paper under the banner headline "DEAD!"; Howard gained overnight popularity, and was paid very well for the image. Thereafter he worked in newspaper photography in Washington and Chicago, retiring as chief photographer for the Chicago Sun-Times in 1961, the year of his death. He had been in semi-retirement since 1951 following a heart attack.

The camera Howard used to snap the shot is part of the collection of the Smithsonian's National Museum of American History.

The state attempted to prosecute Howard and the newspaper, but nothing ever came of it. For many years afterwards witnesses to executions were searched and asked to hold up their hands so they could not operate hidden cameras.

Personal life
Howard's grandson is actor George Wendt, and his great-grandson is actor and comedian Jason Sudeikis. His wife, Helen, died in 1958.

References

1894 births
1961 deaths
American photojournalists
People from Chicago
Journalists from Illinois
20th-century American photographers
20th-century American journalists
American male journalists